Álvaro Raúl Estrella Zapata (born 14 August 1980) is a Swedish singer and dancer with Chilean origin who has participated four times in Melodifestivalen (2014, 2020, 2021 and 2022), the selection process for picking the Swedish entry to the Eurovision Song Contest.

Melodifestivalen
In 2014 he competed with the song "Bedroom" written by Jakke Erixson, Jon Bordon, Loren Francis, Kristofer Östergren. He sang in the first semi-final in Malmö but he didn't pass to the final, taking the 6th place.

Estrella has also appeared as dancer for many years in the Melodifestivalen contest including for singer Danny Saucedo in Saucedo's song "Amazing" in 2012.

He participated in Melodifestivalen 2020 with the song "Vamos Amigos" along with Mendez. The song reached the finale through the Second Chance round and ended up in eleventh place, scoring a total of 40 points.

He participated in Melodifestivalen 2021 with the song "Bailá Bailá" performed on 20 February 2021, qualifying to the "andra chansen" (second chance) round, where he won his duel and qualified for the final. He performed in the final on 13 March 2021, finishing in 10th place with a total of 26 points.

He participated in Melodifestivalen 2022 with the song ”Suave”. He performed in Heat 2 on 12 February 2022, qualifying to the semi-final. He performed again on 5 March 2022, failing to qualify to the final.

Others
In 2014, he dubbed the role of the lead character Manolo Sánchez in the Swedish version of the animated film The Book of Life.

He developed a dancing career and has danced for many artists including Danny Saucedo, Eric Saade and others.

Discography

Singles

Filmography
The Book of Life in dubbing role of Manolo Sánchez (in Swedish)

References

1980 births
Living people
Swedish people of Chilean descent
21st-century Swedish singers
21st-century Swedish male singers
Melodifestivalen contestants of 2022
Melodifestivalen contestants of 2021
Melodifestivalen contestants of 2020
Melodifestivalen contestants of 2014